Walter von Cronberg (1477 or 1479 – 4 April 1543) was the 38th Grand Master of the Teutonic Order, serving from 1527 to 1543.

Biography 
Von Cronberg hailed from a rather poor family of knights from Kronberg Castle near Frankfurt. He joined the Teutonic Order in 1497 and held the post of a tax collector in the Komturei of Mergentheim from 1499. He became the Komtur of Frankfurt in 1504. During the times of his predecessor Albert of Brandenburg-Ansbach, von Cronberg was the legate to King Sigismund I the Old of Poland. In 1517 he founded the Brotherhood of St. Sebastian and in 1526 he was chosen Deutschmeister, the Master of the German branch of the Order. 

In 1525, when Albert had converted to Lutheranism and was excommunicated, von Cronberg declared himself the next Grand Master. His claim was based on a statute of Werner von Orseln from the 14th century which stated that in the case of the absence of the Grand Master, the Master of one of the other branches of the Order would resume the position. 

However, this decision was met with some resistance from the Master of the Livonian branch, Wolter von Plettenberg, who also laid a claim to this function. The conflict was averted by Emperor Charles V who settled the matter in 1527 in favour of von Cronberg, declaring him "Administrator of the Office of Grand Master". Also, the claim of the Grand Master to Albert's Duchy of Prussia was renewed. As no control could be exercised there, the Grand Master's seat was moved from Königsberg to the seat of the Deutschmeister in southern Germany, Mergentheim near Würzburg. 

From 1530, von Cronberg dedicated himself to save the Catholic character of the Order. He was unsuccessful, however, in preventing further secularization of the Teutonic Order in the Holy Roman Empire, with increasingly more knights breaking the oath by conversion to Protestantism or disobedience to the Catholic Grand Masters.

1470s births
1545 deaths
People from Kronberg im Taunus
Grand Masters of the Teutonic Order